Jordi Requejo Coronado (born November 17, 1998) is a Spanish kickboxer who competes in the light middleweight division. He is the current WKN World Super Welterweight Champion.

Career
On May 25, 2019, Requejo faced Štefan Mészáros for the WKN World super welterweight title at the Trophée de l’Éphèbe de Kickboxing 16 event. He won the fight by TKO in the first round after his opponent broke his tibia.

On July 10, 2021, Requejo made the first defense of his WKN world title at Villejuif Boxing Show 3 against Christian Berthely. Requejo won the fight by majority decision.

On March 30, 2019, Requejo faced Mickael Pignolo at a BFS event. The fight was declared a draw after three rounds.

Requejo was scheduled to face the reigning ISKA super welterweight world champion Guerric Billet at La Nuit Des Champions 28 on November 20, 2021, in a non-title bout. He won the fight by decision.

On July 2, 2022, Requejo faced Kevin Yapi as a defense of his WAKO Pro European title at Le Choc des Best Fighters 6 event. He lost the fight by decision.

Championships and accomplishments

Professional
 World Kickboxing Network
WKN World Super Welterweight Championship (One Time)
One successful title defense

 World Association of Kickboxing Organizations
WAKO-PRO European −71.8 kg/158.2 lb Championship (One Time)

 Organizacion Mundial Kick Boxing España
 OMKE Catalunia −70kg Champion

Amateur
2021 FEKM Spain K-1 Champion 
2021 WAKO World Cup in Hungary K-1 -75kg 
 2022 WAKO European Champpionships K-1 -75kg

Kickboxing record 

|-
|- style="background:#cfc;"
| 2023-02-11 || Win ||align=left| Majid Amarouche || UAM Fight Night K-1 || Abu Dhabi, UAE || Decision (majority) || 3 || 3:00  

|- style="background:#fbb;" 
| 2022-09-30 || Loss ||align=left| Sorin Căliniuc || Colosseum Tournament 35 || Târgoviște, Romania || Decision (unanimous) || 5 || 3:00 
|-
! style=background:white colspan=9 |

|- style="background:#fbb;"  
| 2022-07-02 || Loss ||align=left| Kevin Yapi || Le Choc des Best Fighters 6 || Asnières-sur-Seine, France || Decision (split) || 5 || 3:00 
|-
! style=background:white colspan=9 |

|- style="background:#cfc;"
| 2022-04-30 || Win ||align=left| Mario Andrea Nani || Fight For Glory Gold Edition || Malgrat de Mar, Spain || KO (punches) || 4 || 1:02  
|-
! style=background:white colspan=9 |
|-
|- style="background:#cfc;"  
| 2022-04-02 || Win ||align=left| Chris Lalone || WAKO: Team USA vs Team Spain || Oak Grove, Kentucky, United States || KO (knee to the body) || 2 || 1:35  
|-
|- style="background:#cfc;"
| 2021-11-20 || Win ||align=left| Guerric Billet || Nuit Des Champions 28 || Marseille, France || Decision (unanimous) || 3 || 3:00  
|-
|- style="background:#cfc;"  
| 2021-07-10 || Win ||align=left| Christian Berthely || Villejuif Boxing Show 3 || Villejuif, France || Decision (majority) || 5 || 3:00  
|-
! style=background:white colspan=9 | 

|- style="background:#cfc;"  
| 2019-10-19 || Win ||align=left| Rubén González || Storm Series || Madrid, Spain || KO (punch) || 2 || 0:34

|- style="background:#cfc;"  
| 2019-05-25 || Win ||align=left| Štefan Mészáros || Trophée de l’Éphèbe de Kickboxing 16 || Agde, France || TKO (leg injury) || 1 || 1:43 
|-
! style=background:white colspan=9 | 

|-  style="background:#c5d2ea;"
| 2019-03-30 || Draw||align=left| Mickael Pignolo || Boxing Fighters System || Nîmes, France || Decision || 3 || 3:00  

|- style="background:#cfc;"  
| 2019-01-07 || Win ||align=left| Andy Carter || Armados y Peligrosos || Montgat, Spain || Decision (unanimous) || 4 || 2:00  

|- style="background:#c5d2ea;"  
| 2018-11-10|| Draw ||align=left| Nelson Buale Choni || World Fight Tour 9 || Barcelona, Spain || Decision || 3 || 3:00 
|-
|- style="background:#cfc;"  
| 2018-07-18 || Win ||align=left| Otmun el Akracu || Stars Fight Night || Badalona, Spain || TKO (punches) || 2 || 0:46
|-
! style=background:white colspan=9 |

|-  style="background:#cfc;"
| 2018-06-16 || Win ||align=left| Kevin Valderas || Iron Fighters 4 || Castelldefels, Spain || KO (punch) || 3 || 1:48

|- style="background:#cfc;"  
| 2017-11-30 || Win ||align=left| Rubén Semper || Time to Fight 2 || Spain || Decision (unanimous) || 3 || 3:00  

|- style="background:#fbb;"  
| 2016-10-16 || Loss ||align=left| Diego Agustín Soriano || Lords of the Ring || Lloret de Mar, Spain || TKO (referee stoppage) || 3 || 2:37 

|-
| colspan=9 | Legend:    

|- style="background:#fbb;" 
| 2022-11- || Loss ||align=left| Ali Yuzeir || 2022 WAKO European Championships, Semi-finals || Antalya, Turkey || Decision (3:0) || 3 || 2:00 
|-
! style=background:white colspan=9 | 

|- style="background:#cfc;" 
| 2022-11- || Win ||align=left| Ziga Pecnik || 2022 WAKO European Championships, Quarter Finals || Antalya, Turkey || Decision (3:0) || 3 || 2:00 

|- style="background:#cfc;" 
| 2022-11- || Win ||align=left| Petar Musura || 2022 WAKO European Championships, First Round || Antalya, Turkey || Decision (3:0) || 3 || 2:00 

|- style="background:#fbb;" 
| 2021-10- || Loss ||align=left| Alessio Zeloni|| 2021 WAKO World Championships, 1/8 Finals || Jesolo, Italy || Decision (3:0) || 3 || 2:00 

|- style="background:#cfc;" 
| 2021-10- || Win ||align=left| Serikbolsyn Bodauov|| 2021 WAKO World Championships, First Round || Jesolo, Italy || Decision (2:1) || 3 || 2:00 

|-
| colspan=9 | Legend:

See also 
 List of male kickboxers

References

External links  
 Jordi Requejo at Tapology

  
1998 births
Living people
Spanish male kickboxers
Middleweight kickboxers
Kickboxing champions